Liāna Rožaščonoka (born 1 November 2002) is a Latvian footballer who plays as a defender for Latvian Women's League club Rīgas FS and the Latvia women's national team.

Club career
Rožaščonoka has played for RFS in Latvia.

International career
Rožaščonoka made her senior debut for Latvia on 10 June 2021.

References

External links

2002 births
Living people
Latvian women's footballers
Women's association football defenders
Rīgas FS players
Latvia women's youth international footballers
Latvia women's international footballers